The following highways are numbered 644:

United States